Eve is a Japanese-language song, and the 14th single, by Japanese idol group Idoling!!!. It reached number 5 on Oricon chart.

Contents 
Eve released in three types:
 Limited A-type (CD and DVD)
 Limited B-type (CD and original QT Card)
 Normal Type (CD only)

Track listing

CD

DVD
 "eve" music video
 Making-of "eve" music video and CD jacket photo session

Notes
 "Caramel Latte Nomi Iko-!" sung by #3 Mai Endō, #6 Erica Tonooka, #7 Erika Yazawa, #8 Phongchi, #12 Yui Kawamura, #13 Serina Nagano, #14 Hitomi Sakai, #16 Ami Kikuchi, #17 Hitomi Miyake, #21 Kaede Hashimoto, and #26 Chika Ojima.

References

External links
 Idoling!!! official website - Fuji TV
 Idoling!!! official website - Pony Canyon

2010 singles
Idoling!!! songs
2010 songs
Pony Canyon singles